Prabowo Subianto's presidential campaign in 2024 is his third bid for the presidency of Indonesia. For his third bid, his party, Gerindra Party, formed a coalition with the National Awakening Party on 18 June 2022. The coalition named as Great Indonesia Awakening Coalition. On 7 January 2023, the office exercised his presidential campaign' mission, named as Gerindra Presidential Election-winning Agency, was inaugurated. On 23 January 2023, the coalition joint secretariat was inaugurated.

Currently, no one is named as his running mate, which is being discussed with the National Awakening Party.

Coalition Parties 

 Gerindra Party
 National Awakening Party

Prospected Parties 
There is chance that United Indonesia Coalition of the United Development Party, National Mandate Party, and Golkar Party to be integrated with the Great Indonesia Awakening Coalition. United Development Party opened the possibility to merge the coalition on 13 February 2023 and expressed their support to Prabowo for his presidency bid.

Indonesian Democratic Party of Struggle (PDIP-P) stance is currently unknown. However, the party already made clear and closed the opportunity to make a coalition with the Nasdem Party, Prosperous Justice Party, and Democratic Party because they declared Anies Baswedan as Presidential Candidate, leaving no party to make a coalition with the PDI-P if all parties supported Prabowo or Anies.

References 

Indonesian presidential campaigns
2022 in Indonesia
2023 in Indonesia
2024 elections in Indonesia